Old Slab is a design of residential blocks used in Hong Kong public housing estates.  The buildings of this type consist of one or more elongated rectangular blocks, joining end by end. As of 2018 there were 257 of these structures in the city.

Gallery

See also

 Types of public housing estate blocks in Hong Kong

References

Public housing in Hong Kong
Architecture in Hong Kong